"Three Pistols" is a song by The Tragically Hip. The song was released as the second single from the band's second studio album, Road Apples. The song reached No. 1 on the RPM CANCON (Canadian Content) chart. The title of the song refers to the city of Trois-Pistoles, Quebec, and the song is about the Canadian artist Tom Thomson.

Charts

References

1991 singles
The Tragically Hip songs
1991 songs
MCA Records singles
Songs about Canada